The Yacht Club de Chile is a yacht club in Viña del Mar, Chile. This club was established in 1955.

Description
The Yacht Club de Chile is located in Caleta Higuerilla, a pleasant cove. Its club house has an attached  restaurant with a swimming pool and palm trees.
 
The club's marina provides electric connexions for moored yachts.

References

External links
 Official website
 Basic information for yacht skippers

Yacht clubs in Chile
Sports venues in Valparaíso Region